The 2001 Sybase Open was a men's tennis tournament played on indoor hard courts at the Compaq Center at San Jose in San Jose, California in the United States that was part of the International Series of the 2001 ATP Tour. It was the 113th edition of the tournament and was held from February 26 through March 4, 2001. Eighth-seeded Greg Rusedski won the singles title.

Finals

Singles

 Greg Rusedski defeated  Andre Agassi 6–3, 6–4
 It was Rusedski's only title of the year and the 13th of his career.

Doubles

 Mark Knowles /  Brian MacPhie defeated  Jan-Michael Gambill /  Jonathan Stark 6–3, 7–6(7–4)
 It was Knowles' 2nd title of the year and the 16th of his career. It was MacPhie's 1st title of the year and the 3rd of his career.

References

Sybase Open
SAP Open
Sybase Open
Sybase Open
Sybase Open
Sybase Open